Sulev Kannimäe (born 16 June 1955) is an Estonian politician. He is a member of XIV Riigikogu.

He was born in Kiviõli. In 1994, he graduated from Estonian University of Life Sciences.

References

Living people
1955 births
Estonian Reform Party politicians
20th-century Estonian politicians
21st-century Estonian politicians
Members of the Riigikogu, 2019–2023
Estonian University of Life Sciences alumni
People from Kiviõli